Kirsten Knudsen (born 2 July 1953) is a Danish former middle-distance freestyle swimmer. She competed in two events at the 1972 Summer Olympics.

References

External links
 

1953 births
Living people
Danish female freestyle swimmers
Olympic swimmers of Denmark
Swimmers at the 1972 Summer Olympics
Swimmers from Copenhagen